Daniel Divet, (born 11 December 1966), is a French former rugby league footballer who played as  or .

Biography 
During his career, he is one of the few French players to start an overseas experience playing for English sides  such as Hull FC and Featherstone Rovers. In France, he notably played for Carcassonne and Limoux.

His club performance allowed him to represent France with which he notably disputed the 1985-1988 and 1989-1992 Rugby League World Cups.

Honours

Club 
French Rugby League Championship:
Runner-up in 1990 (Carcassonne)
Champion in 1992 (Carcassonne)
Lord Derby Cup: 
Champion en 1990 (Carcassonne)
Champion in 1996 (Limoux)
Runner-up in 1997 (Limoux)
Rugby Football League Championship Second Division
Champion in 1993 (Featherstone Rovers)

References

External links 

 (en)  Daniel Divet at rugbyleagueproject.com

France national rugby league team players
French rugby league players
Living people
1966 births
Rugby league second-rows
Rugby league locks
Featherstone Rovers players
AS Carcassonne players
Limoux Grizzlies players
Hull F.C. players